Hydra Bay (Afrikaans: Hydrabaai), also known as Romansbaai, is a bay in South Africa near the settlement of Van Dyks Bay.

Geography
Hydra Bay is an open bay of the South Atlantic Ocean lying 3 km to the northeast of the Danger Point Lighthouse. The bay is facing west, with a fine beach in its central part.

References

Bays of South Africa